The Hulk is a comic book superhero in the . Since 1962, he has starred in several ongoing series, as well as a large number of limited series, annuals, one-shots and specials. Also, other ongoing series titled Hulk have featured Red Hulk, Amadeus Cho, or Jen Walters as the title character. All stories are published exclusively by Marvel Comics under their standard imprint unless otherwise noted.

Primary series
 The Incredible Hulk #1–6 (May 1962March 1963)
 Tales to Astonish #59–101 (September 1964March 1968)
 The Incredible Hulk #102–474 (April 1968March 1999)
 The Incredible Hulk #−1 (July 1997)
 The Incredible Hulk Annual #1–20 (1968–1969; 1971–1972; 1976–1986; 1990–1994)
 The Incredible Hulk Annual 1997
 The Incredible Hulk/Sub-Mariner Annual '98
 X-Man/The Incredible Hulk Annual '98
 Hulk #1–11 [#475–485] (April 1999February 2000)
 Hulk # (Marvel Comics / Wizard Magazine, April 1999)
 Hulk Annual 1999
 The Incredible Hulk vol. 2 #12–112 [#486–586] (March 2000December 2007; series renamed The Incredible Hercules with #112 [cover] or #113 [officially] until #141)
 The Incredible Hulk Annual 2000–2001
 Hulk vol. 2 #1–12 [#587–598], #13–57 (March 2008October 2012; featuring Red Hulk from #13 to #57, series renamed Red Hulk with #58 until #67)
 Incredible Hulk #600–611 [#599–610] (September 2009October 2010)
 Incredible Hulks #612–635 [#611–634] (November 2010October 2011)
 Incredible Hulks Annual #1 (August 2011)
 The Incredible Hulk vol. 3 #1–15 [#635–649] (December 2011December 2012)
 Indestructible Hulk #1–20 [#650–669] (January 2013April 2014)
 Indestructible Hulk Special #1 (December 2013)
 Indestructible Hulk Annual #2013 (February 2014)
 Hulk vol. 3 #1–16 [#670–685] (April 2014July 2015)
 Hulk Annual #1 (November 2014)
 The Totally Awesome Hulk #1–23 [#686–708] (featuring Amadeus Cho; February 2016November 2017)
 Hulk vol. 4 #1–11 [#148-158] (Joe Moloney numbering; February 2017December 2017)
 The Incredible Hulk #709–717 (December 2017May 2018)
 The Immortal Hulk #1–50 [#718–767] (June 2018October 2021)
The Immortal Hulk #0 (November 2020)
 Hulk vol. 5 #1–14 [#768–781] (November 2021  April 2023)
Hulk Annual #1 (May 2023)
The Incredible Hulk vol. 4 #1- [#782-] (June 2023-)

Timeline
Each horizontal bar shows a reset of numbering, and the last has multiple resets:

Spin-off series
 The Savage She-Hulk #1–25 (February 1980February 1982)
 The Sensational She-Hulk #1–60 [#26-85] (May 1989February 1994)
 Hulk 2099 #1–10 (December 1994September 1995)
 She-Hulk #1–12 [#86-97] (May 2004April 2005)
 She-Hulk vol. 2 #1–38 [#98-135] (October 2005April 2009)
 The Incredible Hercules #113–141 (January 2008 — April 2010)
 Skaar: Son of Hulk #1–12 (August 2008August 2009)
 Son of Hulk #13–17 (September 2009January 2010)
 Red She-Hulk #58–67 (December 2012July 2013)
 She-Hulk vol. 3 #1–12 [#136-147] (February 2014April 2015)
 She-Hulk vol. 1 (Legacy numbering) #159–163 (January 2018May 2018)

Limited series and one-shots

 The Rampaging Hulk #1–9 (January 1977June 1978)
 The Hulk! #10–27 (August 1978June 1981)
 The Rampaging Hulk vol. 2 #1–6 (August 1998January 1999)
 Batman vs. The Incredible Hulk (April 1982)
 The Incredible Hulk and Wolverine (October 1986)
 The Incredible Hulk and the Thing: The Big Change! (Marvel Graphic Novel No. 29 (May 1987))
 She-Hulk Ceremony #1–2 (October-November1989)
 The Incredible Hulk: Future Imperfect #1–2 (December 1992January 1993)
 The Incredible Hulk vs. Venom (April 1994)
 Prime vs. The Incredible Hulk #0 (July 1995)
 Cutting EdgeThe Hulk:...Ghosts of the Future #1 (December 1995)
 Marvel Edge: The Savage Hulk #1 (January 1996)
 Incredible Hulk/Hercules: Unleashed #1 (October 1996)
 Hulk/Pitt (December 1996)
 The Incredible Hulk vs. Superman (July 1999)
 The Incredible Hulk: Islands of Adventure (July 1999)
 Sentry: Hulk (February 2001)
 Hulk Smash #1–2 (March–April 2001)
 Startling Stories: Banner #1–4 (July–October 2001)
 Marvel Knights: Wolverine/Hulk #1–4 (April–July 2002)
 Thing/She-Hulk: The Long Night (May 2002)
 Hulk: The End (August 2002)
 Hulk/Wolverine: Six Hours #1–4 (March 2003)
 The Incredible Hulk: Nightmerica #1–6 (August 2003January 2004)
 Hulk: Gray #1–6 (December 2003April 2004)
 Hulk: Gamma Games #1–3 (February–April 2004)
 Hulk: Unchained #1–3 (March–May 2004)
 Darkness/Hulk (July 2004)
 Hulk/Thing: Hard Knocks #1–4 (November 2004February 2005)
 Marvel Age: Hulk #1–4 (November 2004February 2005)
 What if General Ross had become the Hulk? (February 2005)
 The Incredible Hulk: Destruction #1–4 (May–August 2005)
 Captain Universe/The Incredible Hulk (January 2006)
 Ultimate Wolverine vs. Hulk #1–6 (February 2006July 2009)
 Planet Hulk: Giant Size Hulk #1 (August 2006)
 Mythos Hulk #1 (October 2006)
 Hulk and Power Pack #1–4 (May–August 2007)
 World War Hulk Prologue: World Breaker #1 (July 2007)
 World War Hulk #1–5 (August 2007January 2008)
 World War Hulk: Front Line #1–6 (August–December 2007)
 World War Hulk: X-Men #1–3 (August–October 2007)
 World War Hulk: Gamma Files #0 (August 2007)
 World War Hulk: Gamma Corps #1–4 (September 2007January 2008)
 Marvel Adventures: Hulk #1–16 (September 2007December 2008)
 What if Planet Hulk (December 2007)
 World War Hulk: AfterSmash! (January 2008)
 World War HulkAfterSmash: Warbound #1–5 (February–June 2008)
 World War HulkAfterSmash: Damage Control #1–3 (March–May 2008)
 Hulk vs. Fin Fang Foom #1 (February 2008)
 Ultimate Human #1–4 (January–June 2008)
 Hulk vs. Hercules (June 2008)
 Giant Size Incredible Hulk #1 (July 2008)
 Hulk: Raging Thunder #1 (August 2008)
 Monster Size Hulk (December 2008)
 Ultimate Hulk Annual (December 2008)
 Hulk Family: Green Genes (February 2009)
 She-Hulk: Cosmic Collision (February 2009)
 All New Savage She-Hulk #1–4 (June–September 2009)
 X-Men vs. Hulk #1 (March 2009)
 Hulk: Broken Worlds #1–2 (May–July 2009)
 Planet Skaar Prologue (July 2009)
 Skaar: Son of Hulk Presents: The Savage World of Sakaar (November 2009)
 Hulk Team-Up #1 (November 2009)
 What if World War Hulk (February 2010)
 Hulk: Winter Guard #1 (February 2010)
 Fall of the Hulks: Alpha (February 2010)
 Fall of the Hulks: Gamma (February 2010)
 Fall of the Hulks: Red Hulk #1–4 (March–June 2010)
 Fall of the Hulks: Savage She-Hulks #1–3 (May–July 2010)
 Realm of Kings: Son of Hulk #1–4 (April–July 2010)
 Hulk: Let the Battle Begin #1 (May 2010)
 She-Hulk: Sensational (May 2010)
 The Incredible Hulks: Enigma Force #1–3 (November 2010January 2011)
 She-Hulks #1–4 (January–April 2011)
 Marvel Vault: The Incredible Hulk and the Human Torch (August 2011) 
 Fear Itself: Hulk vs. Dracula #1–3 (November–December 2011)
 Hulk Smash Avengers #1–5 (July 2012)
 Hulk: Season One #1 (August 2012)
 Marvel Universe: Hulk and The Agents of Smash #1–4 (December 2013March 2014)
 Marvel Knights: Hulk #1–4 (February–May 2014)
 Savage Hulk #1–6 (August 2014January 2015)
 Original Sin: Hulk vs. Iron Man #3.1–3.4 (August–October 2014)
 Thanos vs. Hulk #1–4 (February–May 2015)
 Secret WarsWarzones: Future Imperfect #1–5 (2015)
 Secret WarsWarzones: Planet Hulk #1–5 (2015)
 The FallenCivil War II #1 (October 2016)
 Thor vs. Hulk: Champions of the Universe #1–4 (SeptemberOctober 2017)
 Generations: Banner Hulk & The Totally Awesome HulkThe Strongest #1 (October 2017)
 Immortal Hulk: The Best Defense (March 2019)
 Absolute Carnage: Immortal Hulk (December 2019)
 Immortal Hulk: Great Power #1 (March 2020)
 Maestro #1–5 (October 2020February 2021)
 Immortal Hulk: The Threshing Place #1 (November 2020)
 Immortal She-Hulk #1 (November 2020)
 King in Black: Immortal Hulk #1 (February 2021)
 Maestro: War and Pax #1–5 (March 2021July 2021)
 Immortal Hulk: Flatline #1 (April 2021)
 Immortal Hulk: Time of Monsters #1 (July 2021)

Collected editions

Marvel Masterworks

Essential Marvel

Marvel Epic Collection

Marvel Omnibus

Other collections

The Incredible Hulk vol. 1

Hulk vol. 1 & The Incredible Hulk vol. 2

Hulk vol. 2

The Incredible Hulk (2009 relaunch), The Incredible Hulks & The Incredible Hulk vol. 3

Indestructible Hulk

Hulk vol. 3

Totally Awesome Hulk and Incredible Hulk (2017 relaunch)

Hulk vol. 4

The Immortal Hulk

Hulk Vol. 5

Limited series

References

Hulk
Lists of comics by character
Lists of comics by Marvel Comics
Hulk (comics)